Lake Gilmer is four miles (6 km) west of downtown Gilmer, Texas, in the United States. It is located at State Highway 852 (SH 852).

The lake opened on September 29, 2001. It is 1,010 acres (4.1 km²) in size and has another 1557 acres (6.3 km²) of land that is planned to be developed into hiking and nature trails.

References

Gilmer
Protected areas of Upshur County, Texas
Bodies of water of Upshur County, Texas
2001 establishments in Texas